is a role-playing video game developed by Level-5 for the Nintendo 3DS. As indicated by the name, it is the third game of the main series of Yo-kai Watch video games, initially released in two versions, branded Sushi and Tempura in Japan in July 2016. A third version of the game, branded Sukiyaki, was released in Japan in December 2016, adding minor enhancements upon the original versions of the game. An English version based on Sukiyaki published by Nintendo was released in PAL regions in December 2018, and in North America two months later. Yo-kai Watch 3 is the first mainline Yo-kai Watch game not to be localized in Korean.

The game follows the interconnected stories of two protagonists who both possess watches allowing them to see, befriend, and summon Japanese mythical spirits called Yo-kai: Nathan Adams, a boy who recently moved to the fictitious Southern United States city of St. Peanutsburg, and Hailey Anne Thomas, a self-styled otaku "outcast" who deals with yo-kai in the upstate city of Springdale. Unlike the first two games, the player is not given a choice to select Katie Forester as the protagonist instead of Nathan Adams.

The game received generally positive reviews from critics. However, the game was considered a commercial failure outside of Japan and Level-5 Abby would shut down localisation in the west for good in Fall of 2020.

Gameplay

Synopsis
Nathan Adams (Keita Amano in the Japanese release) has moved from the upstate American city of Springdale to the southern town of 'BBQ' after his father was transferred (in the original Japanese release, the move is overseas from Japan to America). The Yo-kai around BBQ have corresponding "American" looks and abilities. Unlike the first two games, the player is not given the choice to select between Adams and an equivalent female protagonist, Katie Forester.

Meanwhile, back in Springdale, which served as the setting for the first two games, Hailey Anne Thomas (Inaho Misora in the Japanese release) is now a playable character who has formed a Yo-kai detective team, solving mysteries and requests from Yo-kai and humans.

Plot
Nate and his family move to St. Peanutsburg, in a fictitious country called BBQ, after Nate's father transferred his business there. During his story arc of the main game, Nate, Whisper, and Jibanyan befriend Buck, who was able to see Yo-kai because of his stone that he wears on his necklace. Meanwhile, rumors of a UFO circulated around town, as the FBY agents, Blunder and Folly, were investigating the case.

Also available for the first time in, Hailey Anne makes her debut in the main series games. Unlike Nate though, her story takes place in Springdale, with Usapyon. In her story arc during the game, she forms the Hapyon Detective Agency, or whatever the player decides to call it. Her story arc involves most of her interactions with Usapyon, and the different cases that the detective agency receives.

Later, Nate, Hailey Anne, Buck, and their befriended Yo-kai team up against a common threat, as the two soon knew what was of the UFO, from the series of events that lead them to this point.

Development
Level-5 announced details for Yo-kai Watch 3 at a press conference in April 2015. The developers promised at least three large-scale feature updates would follow the release of the game.

Details for the third version of the game, Sukiyaki, were announced in October 2016. Sukiyaki included a separate multiplayer mode based on the spinoff game Yo-kai Watch Blasters, the ability to unlock "God Yo-kai" by linking all three versions together, and would tie into the story of the third Yo-kai Watch movie, Yo-kai Watch: Soratobu Kujira to Double no Sekai no Daibōken da Nyan!. The Yo-kai Watch Blasters Treasure mode was added to Sushi and Tempura as the first major update, after the release of Sukiyaki.

Version 3.0 of Yo-kai Watch 3 was launched in Spring 2017, adding new Enma, quests, locations, dungeons, and yo-kai. The next major feature update, version 4.0, was launched in Summer 2017, with similar added features.

Localization 
The original Japanese release involves a culture shift from a Japanese setting to an American one; rather than a similar overseas move, the western release of Yo-kai Watch 3 frames the same shift from Springdale to BBQ as a move from a Japanese interpretation of an average American city to a representation of the Southern United States. The cultural contrasts the protagonist experiences are changed to highlight the cultural clash between what he is used to in upstate America and the culture of a city in the American south. In order to make the localization feel more "realistic", the awkward nature of this cultural clash is often played for comedy purposes. For example, an early plot element in the original Japanese release of the game involved the protagonist not understanding the local residents because he did not know English, with minimal straight comedy. In the localized release, the protagonist now fails to understand the thick southern drawl of the residents, and turned into a full-on comedic premise.

According to prerelease coverage and marketing materials, the localization turned America into the fictitious country of BBQ, with Nathan Adams moving to the city of St. Peanutsburg within BBQ. However, in-game dialogue makes it clear that this is not the case and that 'BBQ' is within the same state (as it makes frequent reference to Springdale being "upstate", and Nate and his family having moved across-state, rather than overseas).

Marketing
The covers for the initial Sushi and Tempura versions were released alongside the announcement the game would be split into two versions in April 2016. The cover for Sushi features the American equivalents of Komasan and Komajiro, renamed the KK Brothers; the cover for Tempura has Tomnyan, the American version of Jibanyan. Sushi & Tempura sold 632,135 copies combined during its release week, less than half the combined first-week sales of Yo-kai Watch 2.

Sushi and Tempura were bundled together as the Sushi/Tempura Busters T [Treasure] Pack , released on December 15, 2016, alongside Sukiyaki. Sukiyaki sold 337,979 copies during its release week; the Sushi/Tempura Busters bundle sold 17,709.

Reception

Yo-kai Watch 3 was positively reviewed in Famitsu, scoring 37/40 for both the Sushi & Tempura versions. The Sukiyaki version received the same score.

In the United States, GameSpot scored the game 6/10, calling it "a fun time" and "a cheerful, wacky playground where Pokémon-like creatures happen to live." Nintendo Life was significantly more enthusiastic, scoring the game at 9/10 and declaring it "a triumphant last hurrah for one of the [3DS] platform's most beloved series." Overall, the game was rated 80/100 on Metacritic.

Despite positive reviews, the game sold less than its two predecessors in Japan, selling 2 million copies overall. The game was also a commercial failure in the United States, selling less than 4,000 copies; mainly due to the 3DS nearing the end of its lifecycle and the game itself facing stiff competition from Kingdom Hearts III for the PlayStation 4 and the remake of Resident Evil 2 for the technologically superior Nintendo Switch hybrid console.
Level-5 International America closing its doors and its parent company focusing solely on the Japanese market, where it stayed that way until 2023, when Level-5 returned to the international market.

Sequel
The fourth game in the series, Yo-kai Watch 4, was released for the Nintendo Switch in Japan on June 20, 2019. A western release was confirmed at a panel held during the Anime Expo in July 2019, however, in October 2020, Level 5's North American operations shut down, eliminating any chance for the game to be released for North American players. However, with Level 5 returning to the international market in February 2023, only time will tell if Yo-kai Watch 4 will be localized.

References

External links

2016 video games
Nintendo games
Nintendo 3DS eShop games
Nintendo 3DS games
Nintendo 3DS-only games
Nintendo Network games
Role-playing video games
Video games developed in Japan
Video games set in Japan
Video games set in the United States
Video games with alternative versions
Level-5 (company) games
Yo-kai Watch video games